Héroes de Veracruz is a Mexican football club that plays in the Tercera División de México. The club is based in Puebla City, Puebla and was founded in 2010.

See also
Football in Mexico
Veracruz
Tercera División de México

External links
Tercera Divicion

References 

Association football clubs established in 2009
Football clubs in Veracruz
2009 establishments in Mexico